Ko Tai Chuen (1925 – 30 July 1999) was a Singaporean basketball player. He competed in the men's tournament at the 1956 Summer Olympics.

References

External links
 

1925 births
1999 deaths
Singaporean men's basketball players
Olympic basketball players of Singapore
Basketball players at the 1956 Summer Olympics
Chinese emigrants to Singapore
Singaporean sportspeople of Chinese descent
Place of birth missing